(1563 – May 18, 1633) was a Japanese daimyō of the early Edo period. Hirotaka was the builder of Karatsu Castle. He was a retainer of Toyotomi Hideyoshi, became lord of Karatsu in 1595. 

In 1598, he abandoned his original castle of Nagoya Castle, and started work on a new castle at Karatsu, using many materials from the old one.

In the Battle of Sekigahara in 1600, he joined the forces of Tokugawa Ieyasu. He was rewarded with greater lands around Karatsu, forming a dominion of 123,000 koku.

From 1602-1608, The Tokugawa shogunate ordered neighboring tozama domains to contribute to his new castle construction at Karatsu, and they did so primarily by excavating its network of moats. 

In 1637, in part due to his failure, to suppress the Shimabara rebellion, his lands were confiscated by the Shogunate. He was responsible for part of the overtaxation and mismanagement of local government which instigated the Shimabara Rebellion shortly after his death.

Hirotaka is a playable character from the Eastern Army in the original Kessen.

References
 List of Karatsu lords on "Edo 300 HTML" (8 October 2007)

1563 births
1633 deaths
Daimyo